Jarba is a Palestinian village in the Jenin Governorate.

Nazlat Rahal
Just southwest of Jarba is Nazlat Rahal, where Byzantine ceramics have been found. SWP found at Kh. Haj Rah-hal:  "traces of ruins."

History 
Pottery sherds from the  Byzantine (10%), early Muslim (30%) and the Middle Ages (30%) have been found at Jarba.

Ottoman era
Jarba, like all of Palestine, was incorporated into the Ottoman Empire in 1517.  About 30% of the pottery sherds found in the village date back to this period.  In the 1596 Ottoman tax registers,  it was located in the nahiya of  Jabal Sami, part of Sanjak of Nablus. Jarba was listed as an entirely Muslim village with a population of 11  households and 2 bachelors. The inhabitants paid a fixed tax rate of 33,3% on agricultural products, including wheat, barley, summer crops, olive trees, and goats and/or beehives, in addition to occasional revenues and a tax on people from the Nablus area, a total of 1,500  akçe.

In 1838 el-Jurba  was noted as a village in the District of esh-Sha'rawiyeh esh-Shurkiyeh, the eastern part.

In 1870, Victor Guérin noted it as a small village situated on a neighboring hill from Misilyah.  

In 1882 the PEF's  Survey of Western Palestine (SWP) described   Jurba as:  "a small village on the side of a slope, with olives to the south."

British Mandate  era
In the 1922 census of Palestine, conducted  by the British Mandate authorities, Jarba had a population of 31 Muslims,   increasing in the 1931 census to 65 Muslim, in a total of 17  houses.

In the 1944/5 statistics  the population  was 100, all Muslims, with 3,530 dunams of land, according to an official land and population survey.  100 dunams were used  for plantations and irrigable land, 1,553 for cereals, while 2 dunams were built-up (urban) land.

Jordanian era
In the wake of the 1948 Arab–Israeli War, and after the 1949 Armistice Agreements, Jarba came under Jordanian rule.

post-1967
Since the Six-Day War in 1967, Jarba has been under  Israeli occupation.

References

Bibliography

External links
Welcome To Jarba
Survey of Western Palestine, Map 11:  IAA, Wikimedia commons

Villages in the West Bank
Jenin Governorate
Municipalities of the State of Palestine